The Representation of the People (Scotland) Act 1868 redefined the boundaries of Scottish constituencies of the House of Commons of the Parliament of the United Kingdom (at Westminster), and the new boundaries were first used in the 1868 general election.

For the same general election, boundaries in England were redefined by the Representation of the People Act 1867 and there was, effectively, a transfer of seven parliamentary seats from England to Scotland.

1868 boundaries were used also in the general elections of 1874 and 1880.

As a result of the legislation, Scotland had 22 burgh constituencies, 32 county constituencies and two university constituencies. Except for Edinburgh, Dundee and Glasgow, each Scottish constituency represented a seat for one Member of Parliament (MP). Edinburgh and Dundee represented two seats each, and Glasgow represented three seats.  Therefore, Scotland was entitled to 60 MPs.

15 of the burgh constituencies were districts of burghs.

The constituencies related nominally to counties and burghs, but boundaries for parliamentary purposes were not necessarily those for other purposes.

For the 1885 general election, new boundaries were defined by the Redistribution of Seats Act 1885.

Burgh Constituencies

County constituencies

University constituencies 

 1868
1868 establishments in Scotland
1885 disestablishments in Scotland
Constituencies of the Parliament of the United Kingdom established in 1868
Constituencies of the Parliament of the United Kingdom disestablished in 1885